F comme Fairbanks is a 1976 French drama film directed by Maurice Dugowson. It was entered into the 26th Berlin International Film Festival.

Cast
 Patrick Dewaere – André
 Miou-Miou – Marie
 John Berry – Fragman
 Michel Piccoli – Etienne
 Jean-Michel Folon – Jean-Pierre
 Christiane Tissot – Sylvie
 Diane Kurys – Annick
 Jean Lescot – Jeannot le régisseur
 Jean de Coninck – Le photographe
 Evane Hanska – Françoise
 Thierry Lhermitte – Le jeune cadre
 Guiguin Moro – L'assistante
 Christian Clavier – Le serveur
 Yves Barsacq – Le vieux cadre
 Jenny Clève – La grand-mère
 Marc Lamole – Le patron du bistrot

References

External links

1976 films
1970s French-language films
1976 drama films
Films directed by Maurice Dugowson
French drama films
Films produced by Michel Seydoux
1970s French films